The men's 180 kilometres road race competition at the 2010 Asian Games was held on 22 November.

Park Sung-baek of South Korea originally won the race, but was relegated to 19th place for dangerous sprinting.

Schedule
All times are China Standard Time (UTC+08:00)

Results 
Legend
DNF — Did not finish
DNS — Did not start

References

External links 
Results

Road Men